Mor Philexinos Yuhanon Dolabani; (1885–1969) was the Syriac Orthodox Metropolitan of Mardin, Turkey and its Environs.

Biography
Dolabani was born in 1885 and was ordained Metropolitan in 1947. In 1908 he became a monk in Deyr ul-Zafaran Monastery.

He was a great scholar and poet and had written more than 70 books. He made a number of translations from Syriac to Arabic and Turkish. 
Bishop Dolabani was the first to translate the Syriac Orthodox liturgy into Turkish for the people who moved to Istanbul, because they no longer understood Syriac. 
His extensive writings in Syriac include histories of the Patriarchs, and of the monasteries of Deyr ul-Zafaran Monastery and Mor Gabriel. He printed the books and many others in the monastery, as well as periodical called 'al-Hikmat' (Sophia).

His editions cover many more important texts, several of which are of hitherto unpublished authors. Of his translations into Syriac, those of Patriarch Aphrem Barsaum’s History of Syriac literature, and of the play ‘Theodora’ (by Paulose Behanam, 1916–1969), deserve particular mention. Many of his writings remain unpublished. His scholarly work was recognized and respected by all, as well as his good deeds. He used to ask the people: “What good things have you done? Don’t tell lies, try to say only good things, think of God”. He loved to help poor people.

He is buried in Deyr ul-Zafaran Monastery. The week before he died, when he saw his last article in the Patriarchal Magazine, he said: “I don’t like death to break my pen, because the Church and our youth still needs my pen, but may God’s will be done”.

Metropolitan Mor Julius Yeshu Cicek lived with him for three years in Mardin and he remembers: "He was such a spiritual loving man, always praying. It was enough to see him, to be with him, to live with him. We were living and praying together. He was a man of God, a living example, which is better than words and long talks. 
 
Dolabani was a missionary-minded man. After the end of the persecution of the Armenian and Syriac, Assyrians and Chaldeans in early 20th century, he ordained many number of priests, monks and deacons, and send them to very remote areas as far as 'Bitlis and Van' where the faithful had lost their clergy and forgotten about Christianity. Dressed as lay people, they baptized so many Syriac and also Armenian Christians who had no more clergy. Sebastian P Brock recalls a meeting with the Metropolitan: "I met Bishop Philexinos Dolabani once, a few years before he died, and he has always greatly impressed me, both as a man of great holiness and as a tireless scholar in the service of the Syriac Orthodox Church.

Bibliography
A Commentary on the Mysteries
Women of the Bible
The Poetry of Bar Hebraeus
History of the Monastery of Qartmin: Deyr-el-Umur Tarihi
Catalogue of Syriac Manuscripts in Syrian Churches and Monasteries
Catalogue of Syriac Manuscripts in Za`faran Monastery
Catalogue of the Syriac Manuscripts in St. Mark's Monastery

References

Syriac writers
1854 births
1969 deaths
Syriac Orthodox Church bishops